Carlton Griffin (May 23, 1893 - July 24, 1940) was an American film actor. He appeared in over 50 films between the mid-1910s until 1940. In his first films, he was credited as C. Elliott Griffin or C. E. Griffin.

He was born in New York, New York, and died in Hollywood, California.

Selected filmography
 At the Stage Door (1921)
 Shackles of Gold (1922)
 Girl Shy (1924)
 Men (1924)
 Forbidden Paradise (1924)
 The Great Jewel Robbery (1925)
 Lady of the Night (1925)
 Tramp, Tramp, Tramp (1926)
 Her Big Adventure (1926)
 The Impostor (1926)
 The Pip From Pittsburgh (1930)
 Shivering Shakespeare (1930)
 Another Wild Idea (1934)
 The Lady in Question (1940)
 Five Little Peppers in Trouble (1940)

External links

1893 births
1940 deaths
American male film actors
20th-century American male actors